Tracy Caldwell Dyson (born Tracy Ellen Caldwell; August 14, 1969) is an American chemist and NASA astronaut. Caldwell Dyson was a mission specialist on Space Shuttle Endeavour flight STS-118 in August 2007 and part of the Expedition 23 and Expedition 24 crew on the International Space Station from April 2010 to September 2010. She has completed three spacewalks, logging more than 22 hrs of EVA.

Personal life
Caldwell Dyson is the younger of two girls, was born in Arcadia, California, and later moved to Beaumont, California, in the early 1980s to attend junior high school where her father worked as an electrician. Her recreational interests include running, weight training, hiking, softball, basketball, and auto repair/maintenance. As an undergraduate, she competed in intercollegiate athletics on the CSUF Titans track team as both a sprinter and long jumper. She is married to Naval Aviator George Dyson. She believes in God, and was raised Methodist.. 

In a television interview on the 40th anniversary of the first Moon landing, she said she is the first astronaut who was born after Apollo 11.

Academic career
As an undergraduate researcher at the California State University, Fullerton (CSUF), Caldwell Dyson designed, constructed and implemented electronics and hardware associated with a laser-ionization, time-of-flight mass spectrometer for studying atmospherically relevant gas-phase chemistry.

Also at CSUF, she worked for the Research and Instructional Safety Office as a lab assistant performing environmental monitoring of laboratories using hazardous chemicals and radioactive materials, as well as calibrating survey instruments and helping to process chemical and radioactive waste. During that time (and for many years prior) she also worked as an electrician/inside wireman for her father's electrical contracting company doing commercial and light industrial type construction.

At the University of California, Davis, Caldwell Dyson taught general chemistry laboratory and began her graduate research. Her dissertation work focused on investigating molecular-level surface reactivity and kinetics of metal surfaces using electron spectroscopy, laser desorption, and Fourier transform mass spectrometry techniques. She also designed and built peripheral components for a variable temperature, ultra-high vacuum scanning tunneling microscopy system.

In 1997, Caldwell Dyson received the Camille and Henry Dreyfus Postdoctoral Fellowship in Environmental Science to study atmospheric chemistry at the University of California, Irvine. There she investigated reactivity and kinetics of atmospherically relevant systems using atmospheric pressure ionization mass spectrometry, Fourier transform infrared and ultraviolet absorption spectroscopies. In addition, she developed methods of chemical ionization for spectral interpretation of trace compounds. Caldwell Dyson has published and presented her work in numerous papers at technical conferences and in scientific journals.

NASA career
Selected by NASA in June 1998, Caldwell Dyson reported for training in August 1998. Her Astronaut Candidate Training included orientation briefings and tours, numerous scientific and technical briefings, intensive instruction in Shuttle and International Space Station (ISS) systems, physiological training, ground school to prepare for T-38 flight training, as well as learning water and wilderness survival techniques. Completion of this training and evaluation qualified her for flight assignment as a mission specialist.

In 1999, Caldwell Dyson was assigned to the Astronaut Office ISS Operations Branch as a Russian Crusader, participating in the testing and integration of Russian hardware and software products developed for ISS. In 2000, she was assigned prime crew support astronaut for the ISS Expedition 5 crew, serving as their representative on technical and operational issues throughout the training and on-orbit phase of their mission. During ISS Expeditions 4 through 6, Caldwell Dyson also served as an ISS spacecraft communicator (CAPCOM) inside Mission Control. In 2003, she made a transition to the Astronaut Shuttle Operations Branch and was assigned to flight software verification in the Shuttle Avionics Integration Laboratory (SAIL) and also worked supporting launch and landing operations at Kennedy Space Center, Florida. Caldwell Dyson also served as Lead CAPCOM for Expedition 11.

Since her last landing, Caldwell Dyson continue to be an ISS CAPCOM but also was the ground IV for US EVA 32, EVA performed by Scott Kelly and Kjell Lindgren on October 28, 2015. She also served as CAPCOM for the launch and entry during the first flight of the Boeing Starliner in December 2019. She also lead an team focused on improving stowage and cargo transfer processes aboard the ISS and performed multiple NBL run to develop procedure for ISS spacewalks and paired with new astronaut to transmit her experience as an experienced spacewalker.

As Tracy Dyson, she is the host of a series on NASA TV called StationLife, which focuses on facets of life aboard the International Space Station.

On March 21, 2017, Dyson stood behind President Trump as he signed a bill for NASA to send humans to Mars in the 2030s and receive $19.5 billion in 2018 funding. Dyson and fellow NASA astronaut Chris Cassidy presented Trump with an official flight jacket during the ceremony.

STS-118
Caldwell Dyson was assigned to STS-118 on May 17, 2006. It was announced that she would serve as mission specialist 1 on the first flight of Space Shuttle Endeavour after the Columbia disaster.

On August 8, 2007, which was the 119th Space Shuttle flight, the 22nd flight to the station, and the 20th flight for Endeavour, Tracy Caldwell Dyson lifted off for the first time. 
During the mission Endeavours crew successfully added another truss segment, a new gyroscope and external spare parts platform to the International Space Station. A new system that enables docked shuttles to draw electrical power from the station to extend visits to the outpost was activated successfully. A total of four spacewalks (EVAs) were performed by three crew members. Endeavour carried some 5,000 pounds of equipment and supplies to the station and returned to Earth with some 4,000 pounds of hardware and no longer needed equipment. Traveling 5.3 million miles in space, the STS-118 mission was completed in 12 days, 17 hours, 55 minutes and 34 seconds. 
Finally, on flight day 7 of the flight of STS-118, Caldwell-Dyson celebrated her 38th birthday in space.

Expedition 23/24
Caldwell Dyson was assigned for her second space flight on November 21, 2008. Her second space mission consisted of a 6 month mission to the International Space Station. 

After a successful liftoff on April 2, 2010 from the Baikonur spaceport on board the Soyuz TMA-18 as Board Engineer 2 with Soyuz Commander Aleksandr Skvortsov and Board Engineer 1 Mikhail Korniyenko and following a two-day rendezvous and docking maneuver with the ISS, she joined Expedition 23 as a flight engineer and transferred on June 2, 2010 to Expedition 24 again as a flight engineer after the departure of the Soyuz TMA-17.

During the first half of her flight, Caldwell-Dyson and the Expedition 23 crew were joined by the STS-131 crew from April 7 to April 17. This period was the first and only time that four women were together on board the same spacecraft: Caldwell-Dyson, NASA astronauts Stephanie Wilson and Dorothy Metcalf-Lindenburger, and JAXA astronaut Naoko Yamazaki. From May 16 to May 23, the second and last Space Shuttle visiting mission for Caldwell-Dyson's flight, STS-132, joined the Expedition 23 crew for the installation of the Russian built module : Rassvet.

The second half of Caldwell-Dyson's mission was marked by the failure of a coolant pump at the beginning of August. Caldwell Dyson performed her first spacewalk on August 7, 2010 with NASA astronaut Douglas Wheelock. The task for this first of three contingency EVA was to prepare the malfunctioning coolant pump for replacement on the next spacewalks that took place on August 11, 2010 and August 16, 2010. She performed all of this contingency EVA.

After 176 days, 1 hour, 18 minutes and 38 seconds in space, Caldwell-Dyson landed in Kazakhstan on September 25, 2010. During this spaceflight, she completed three spacewalks, logging 22 hrs and 49 minutes of Extra-vehicular activity work to replace a malfunctioning coolant pump.

Third flight

Since December 2021, Tracy Caldwell-Dyson is back in flight training as a back-up crew member of the Soyuz MS-24. She is backing up her NASA astronaut colleague Loral O'Hara.

Other activities

Caldwell Dyson is a private pilot and conversational in American Sign Language (ASL) and Russian. She is also the lead vocalist for the all-astronaut band Max Q.

In 2011, Caldwell Dyson served as the guest judge on a space-themed episode of the Food Network show Cupcake Wars. She appeared on Episode 3 of MasterChef Junior Season 4.

Caldwell Dyson also advised Jessica Chastain when the actress was preparing to appear as an astronaut and mission commander in the 2015 movie The Martian. Chastain said she was very inspired by Caldwell Dyson.

Caldwell Dyson belongs to the Sigma Xi Research Society and the American Chemical Society.

Awards and honors
 Honorary Doctorate, California State University, Fullerton (CSUF) (May 2008)
 NASA Performance Award (2002 & 2001)
 NASA Go the Extra Mile (GEM) Award (2001)
 NASA Superior Accomplishment Award (2000)
 NASA Group Achievement Award – Russian Crusader Team (2000)
 Camille and Henry Dreyfus Postdoctoral Fellowship in Environmental Science (1997)
 Outstanding Doctoral Student Award in Chemistry from the University of California, Davis (1997)
 American Vacuum Society – HWhetten Award (1996)
 American Vacuum Society Graduate Research Award (1996)
 Pro Femina Research Consortium Graduate Research Award (1996)
 Pro Femina Research Consortium Graduate Award for Scientific Travel (1996)
 University of California, Davis Graduate Research Award (1996)
 University of California, Davis Graduate Student Award for Scientific Travel (1994)
 Patricia Roberts Harris Graduate Fellowship in Chemistry (1993–1997)
 Lyle Wallace Award for Service to the Department of Chemistry, California State University Fullerton (1993)
 National Science Foundation Research Experience for Undergraduates Award (1992)
 Council of Building & Construction Trades Scholarship (1991 and 1992)
 Big West Scholar Athlete (1989–1991)

See also

References

External links

 Official NASA Bio
 Spacefacts biography of Tracy Caldwell Dyson

1969 births
Living people
California State University, Fullerton alumni
Crew members of the International Space Station
Women astronauts
People from Arcadia, California
People from Beaumont, California
University of California, Davis alumni
American women chemists
NASA civilian astronauts
American physical chemists
Space Shuttle program astronauts
Spacewalkers
21st-century American women